Mabel Grace Burkholder (1881–1973) was a Canadian writer and historian.

Biography
Burkholder was born in 1881 to a family of German settlers. She taught for a short time after obtaining a teaching certificate before turning to writing. She published poetry, short stories, poems and books about the history of Hamilton, Ontario from 1911 to 1968. Burkholder had a regular local history column in The Hamilton Spectator and was a member of the city's branch of Canadian Women's Press Club. In 1938, Burkholder was named Hamilton's first Citizen of the Year.

Bibliography

Books

The Shield of Honor (1929)
The Story of Hamilton (1938)
Barton on the Mount (1956)

Short stories

Further reading
Watters, Reginald Eyre. A Checklist of Canadian Literature and Background Material, 1682-1960. (2nd Revised Ed.) Toronto: University of Toronto Press, 1972.

References

External links
 

 

1881 births
1973 deaths
Historians of Canada
20th-century Canadian historians